is a Japanese actress and fashion model.

Filmography

Film

Television

Video on demand

Japanese dub

Publications

Fashion Magazines
 Niko☆Puchi（April 2009 issue - June 2011 issue） - Exclusive model
 Nicola（June 2011 issue - May 2014 issue） - Exclusive model
 Seventeen（September 2014 issue - July 2018 issue） - Exclusive model
 Oggi（August 2018 issue - current） - Regular model, exclusive model since May 2019 issue.

References

External links 
 
 Official blog (since 5 April 2011)
 

Japanese female models
Japanese gravure models
Actors from Chiba Prefecture
1998 births
Living people
Avex Group talents
21st-century Japanese actresses
Models from Chiba Prefecture